No Escape! is an Atari 2600 video game developed and published by Imagic in 1983. The player controls Jason, leader of the Argonauts, who fights off the Furies sent by the Greek gods. A two-player mode, in which the second player competes against the first turn-by-turn, is also available.

Gameplay 

No Escape! begins with Jason imprisoned in the temple of Aphrodite due to stealing the Golden Fleece. Jason must survive against waves of attacking Furies, and the gameplay revolves around having Jason pick up and throw rocks. The player needs to hit the ceiling of the temple, causing a brick to fall onto a Fury; throwing a rock directly at a Fury causes two more Furies to appear in its place. Gameplay is focused around timing the falling brick to intersect with the moving Furies. Subsequent levels increase the difficulty by having the Furies shoot back at the player, fly around faster, and move in different patterns.

The game may be played in single-player mode, or in a two-player mode where each player takes turns.

Release 

Imagic released No Escape! in April 1983. The game included an offer for a free Zircon Video Command joystick by mailing in a coupon from the instruction manual.

Reception 

The game's action was well received as a cross between Breakout and Space Invaders. Hardcore Gaming 101 called the game a "rare gem" and said it has a "completely different feel to any other shooter from that time, or, for that matter, any other shooter since". IGN called it a "strange shooter" but also complimented its "compelling gameplay and some very attractive visuals".  The game was also praised for its final animation showing Jason escaping on Pegasus.

No Escape! received positive reviews for its gameplay, with GameFAQs writing that its playability was "very good", going on to say: "Jason is easy to control and doesn't move too fast or too slow for the tempo of the game. The difficulty increases gradually, and you find yourself trying to beat your last score." In a 1983 review from Electronic Fun with Computers & Games, Imagic was praised for delivering a game with the right balance, providing a "challenge that the player can neither overcome nor resist playing again and again." Conversely, videogamecritic.com criticized the game's difficulty at later levels.

References

External links 

 

1983 video games
Atari 2600 games
Atari 2600-only games
Imagic games
Multiplayer and single-player video games
Video games based on Greek mythology
Video games developed in the United States